Make You Love is the fifth solo album by singer Vanessa Daou, released in 2000.

Critical reception
AllMusic called the album "mature and confident." Billboard called it "easily the artist's most honest, pop-leaning, and ... best collection to date."

Track listing
"You" – 3:52
"A Little Bit of Pain" – 2:54
"Mess Around" – 3:52
"Make You Love" – 4:26
"Show Me" – 3:55
"Lovechild" – 4:15
"Aphrodite" – 3:38
"I Would for You" – 4:26
"A Little Bit of Pain (II)" – 4:08
"Juliette" – 3:46
"Honey in a Jar" – 2:57
"Bittersweet" – 3:56

References

2000 albums
Vanessa Daou albums